Brabant is an unincorporated community in Wayne County, West Virginia, United States. It lies on Lick Creek, east of where it enters East Lynn Lake at West Virginia Route 37.

References

Unincorporated communities in Wayne County, West Virginia
Unincorporated communities in West Virginia